Apolyterio (in demotike, 1976–present) or phased out Apolytirion (in polytonic, katharevousa, up until 1976) is the official senior secondary education school completion Certificate (graduation qualification) in Greece and Cyprus, obtained after successfully completing the third grade of lyceum. It is graded on a 20-point scale. Specific conditions and rules apply to the separate types of lyceum for the Pan-hellenic examinations which are in terms of the same or relevant Pan-hellenic examinations subjects of study as the General Lyceum type, such as the Vocational Lyceum (EPAL) having its own four subjects for the Pan-hellenic examinations.


The types of lyceum (Λύκειο) in Greece are:
 
  (Protypo Lykeio; Model Lyceum; 2015–Present)
  (Mousiko Lykeio; Musical Lyceum; 3 years, 1998–Present)
  (Kalitechniko Lykeio; Art Lyceum; 3 years, 2003–Present)
  (Peiramatiko Lykeio; Experimental Lyceum; 3 years, 2015–Present)
  (ΓΕΛ; Geniko Lykeio; General Lyceum; 3 years, 1976–1996, 2006–Present)
  (ΓΕΛΔΕ ; i.e. comprehensive lyceum; Diapolitismiko Lykeio, General Lyceum of Cross-Cultural Education; 3 years, 2018–Present)
  (ΕΠΑΛ; Epangelmatiko Lykeio; Vocational Lyceum; EPAL; 3 years, 2006–Present)
  (Esperino Geniko Lykeio; Evening General Lyceum; 3 years, 1976–Present)
  (Esperino Epangelmatiko Lykeio; Evening Vocational Lyceum; 3 years)
  (Integrated Special Vocational Gymnasium-Lyceum; ΕΝ.Ε.Ε.ΓΥ-Λ)
  Ekklisiastiko Lykeio; Ecclesiastical General Lyceum; 3 years, 2006–Present)

Greece

Changes over the years 

The system and examinations accepted for entrance into Higher Education HE in Greece went through major changes since 1980. The below timeline of lyceum subjects and Pan-hellenic exams subjects are from the General Lyceum (GEL) only and it is not an exhaustive list of the all types of lyceum nor their subjects nor their subjects of Pan-hellenic exams, while should not be relied upon as a one.

1984–1998 

The most common/known Lyceum is the General Lyceum (Greek: , Geniko Lykeio).

In the first 2 grades, all students are taught the same subjects. In 3rd grade, students followed a core programme of
general education and each Desmi (Α, Β, Γ, and  Δ) followed a specialized program (Greek:  / Desmi (singular), Desmes (plural)).

An Apolytirio of Geniko Lykeio included the GPA (scale 0–20), student's conduct information and consisted of:

From 1984 until 1998 only the total score of the Panhellenic Examinations was accepted for the Higher Education Institutions (HEIs). The total Score was calculated from the individual scores, with one of the subjects having a higher weight percentage.
e.g. for A Desmi: Mathematics, B Desmi: Biology, etc.

The 4 Desmes were:

Students had to preselect their choices in a numerical order of preference—using the bases of last year's Panhellenic Examinations' only as a guide—and submit them to their school on a given deadline, using a 4-pages machine-readable document (Greek: , michanografiko deltio).
The results of the National Examinations determined not only who will pass into highest/higher education but also next year's bases.

The total individual score for every subject was 0–160  which was the sum of the 2 examiners' scores based on the scale 0–80 each. A remarking by a 3rd examiner would determine the final score if there was a large difference between the first two scores.

Maximum total score = ((160 x 1.15)+ (160 x 0.95) + (160 x 0.95) + (160 x 0.95)) x 10 = 6400 units

Units: (Greek: , moria (plural)), same numeric format with the bases.

First, the scores for every student and later the bases for each course were published in every school across the country, directly from the Ministry of Education and Religious Affairs. Bases were also being broadcast on Greek TV during the day.

It was allowed to keep the individual subjects' scores (up to 3) and resit on exams to increase the total score, but only for 2 more examinations.

1999–2004 

There are three grades in Eniaio Lykeio and each grade is divided in classes.

The 1st grade of Eniaio Lykeio operates as an orientation year with a general knowledge programme.

The 2nd grade includes three directions: Humanities (Θεωρητική Κατεύθυνση), Science and Technology.

In the 3rd grade we have again the three directions but the Technology direction operates in two courses: i) the Technology and the Production course and ii) the Information Science and Services course.

In Eniaio Lykeio, there is the Support Teaching Programme. This programme can be attended by those pupils who wish to do so, regardless of their performance.

Right of entrance have only the holders of the Apolytirio lyceum certificate.

The written examinations in the subjects, either at school's level or at national level, count equivalently towards the Apolytirio's GPA. On the contrary, for entrance in highest education only the subjects examined nationally in written form are being considered. The Apolytirio is detached completely from highest education's entrance.

2005–2013 

Panhellenic National Level Examinations involve 6–7 subjects of the General Lyceum (3rd grade). Besides the Lyceum Diploma (Apolytirio) the achievement score on a certificate awarded (Bebaiosi) takes into account final year school grade (school level evaluation) and the grades on 6 subjects of the National Examinations.

2014 - 2020 

For the General Lyceum (GEL) are 4 orientation groups including 4 subjects each :(I) Humanities, Law and Social Sciences (II) Sciences (III) Health Sciences (IV) Economic and Computer Studies. 

In 2019, the Ministry of Education under Kostas Gavroglou of SYRIZA, decided to replace Latin with sociology in the school curriculum. This decision was not met without opposition from academics related to classical humanist studies, who called the move "anachronistic" and the major opposition party, New Democracy. In 2020,the Ministry of Education under Niki Kerameus (ND) reinstated Latin in the school curriculum, again with opposition from SYRIZA and academics related to Sociology.

Since 2020 

For the General Lyceum (GEL) are 3 orientation groups including 3 subjects each: (I) Humanities Sciences (II) Sciences and Health Sciences  (III) Economic and Computer Studies

Acceptance abroad 

Although the total score from the Panhellenic Examinations determined the entrance in higher education in Greece, the final mark GPA (Grade Point Average) of the Apolytirio is the entry qualification most often requested in order to be accepted in higher education abroad. The results of the Panhellenic Examinations are usually not requested or are referred by different names such as General Entrance Examinations.

See also
List of Secondary School Leaving Qualifications
Institutions of Highest Education in Greece
Academic grading in Greece
Education in Greece
Education in Cyprus
Educational stage

References

Education in Greece
Education in Cyprus